Sixth Street is a historic street and entertainment district in Austin, Texas, located within the city's urban core in downtown Austin. Sixth Street was formerly named Pecan Street under Austin's older naming convention, which had east–west streets named after trees and north–south streets named after Texas rivers (the latter convention remains in place).

The nine-block area of East Sixth Street roughly between Lavaca Street to the west and Interstate 35 to the east is recognized as the Sixth Street Historic District and was listed in the National Register of Historic Places on December 30, 1975. Developed as one of Austin's trade and commercial districts in the late 1800s, the predominant building style are two- or three-story masonry Victorian commercial architecture. Most structures in the area had already been built by the 1880s, though a few notable exceptions include the Driskill Hotel (1886), the Scarbrough Building (1910), and the Littlefield Building.

The area around nearby 4th Street and 6th Street has been a major entertainment district since the 1970s. Many bars, clubs, music venues, and shopping destinations are located on East 6th Street between Congress Avenue and Interstate 35, and many offer live music at one time or another during the week. Traffic is generally blocked on East 6th Street and most crossroads from I-35 to Brazos Street on weekend evenings, and football home games (depending on pedestrian traffic), as well as holidays and special events, to allow the crowds to walk unfettered to the many venues that line the street.

East Sixth Street (known locally as Dirty Sixth) plays host to a wide variety of events each year, ranging from music and film festivals (such as South by Southwest) to biker rallies (such as The Republic of Texas Biker Rally) and the Pecan Street Festival.

The area of Sixth Street west of Lavaca is known as the West 6th Street District. Recently, a movement has been growing to develop this area as an entertainment district of its own, geared toward the live-music crowd.

History
Austin was planned on a 15-block grid plan developed by Edwin Waller that was bisected by Congress Avenue running north–south. The Bastrop Highway linking the town to earlier settlements in East Texas was charted in 1839 and chose the route into Austin along Pecan Street. The stagecoach followed this route when it arrived in Austin in 1840, and used the Bullock Hotel at the northwest corner of Pecan and Congress as the stage stop. The Bullock, built in 1839 by Richard Bullock, was a complex of log building which served as the quasiformal and informal meeting place in Austin for several years. That particular intersection quickly became the focal point of town life.

The town grew like a cross up and down Congress and Pecan. Pecan had an obvious advantage for development. The street was far enough from the river to escape flooding, which occasionally spread as far as Cypress Street (3rd Street), and it was the last east–west street flat enough for wagons and pedestrians to travel comfortably. Following an explosive growth in town population between 1850 and 1860, Pecan soon contained not only log and frame houses, but also was lined with wagon yards, livery stables, and saloons to meet the needs of travelers. Austin's first bridge was built to carry Pecan Street across Shoal Creek in 1865, though the narrow iron footbridge, built by the United States Army, could not carry wagon traffic.

While the Civil War interrupted Sixth Street's growth in the 1860s, the following years were the height of Sixth Street's importance as a commercial center. The arrival of the railroad in 1871 was very much to Sixth Street's benefit, as some of Austin's most prestigious business enterprises were located here to be near the railroad depot. Lots along the street were in great demand and fine two- and three-story limestone Victorian commercial structures began to line the streets where one-story frame buildings or vacant lots had been. In 1887, a new, larger bridge across Shoal Creek was built to match the full  width of Sixth Street and permit wagons to cross; this West Sixth Street Bridge is still in use today, and has since been added to the National Register of Historic Places.

During the late 1880s, however, Congress Avenue began to pre-empt Sixth Street as the most fashionable shopping destination in the city. The new Capitol building was being built at the head of Congress and most businesses catering to city-dwellers and/or a state government clientele moved to a Congress location. Sixth Street, though, continued to function as a site for offices, warehouses, and showrooms of businesses using the railroad, as well as to businesses catering to farmers or other travelers. In 1886, the famous four-story Driskill Hotel was completed at 122 E. 6th Street. Called "the finest hotel south of St. Louis", the hotel was built in a Romanesque Revival style by Jesse Driskill, a cattleman who spent his fortune constructing it.

Scarbrough and Hicks department store, founded on the southwest corner of 6th and Congress in 1893, decided to remain in this same location in 1909 when it undertook the construction of Austin's first modern skyscraper; the Scarbrough Building is an eight-story brick building in the Commercial style. George Littlefield chose the northeast corner of that intersection in 1911 for a 9-story brick and limestone building to be built to house his American Bank.

A biracial character was evident along Sixth Street during this period of development, although it became more pronounced in the 1890s and early 1900s. For example, a black physician had an office in the 300 block of East Sixth, and several businesses on the north side of the 400 and 500 blocks were operated by blacks and catered to Austin's black community. By the early 20th century, racial and ethnic diversity had become one of Sixth Street's most striking characteristics. Lebanese businesses also began to appear on 6th Street in the 1890s. One of the first Lebanese immigrants to Austin, Cater Joseph, opened a confectionery on Congress in the 1880s. The Joseph family still maintains a business on East 6th Street, as do several other Lebanese and Syrian families who founded businesses there in the early 20th century. By 1940, businesses on 6th Street were owned by blacks, Jewish, German, Chinese, and Mexican-Americans, as well.

A steady erosion of the commercial importance of the East 6th Street area occurred in the 1940s and particularly accelerated after World War II. A proliferation of second-hand stores, chain and discount stores catered to a lower-income clientele, followed by an increasing number of vacated buildings. A skid-row atmosphere was fostered in the 1950s and 1960s by the multiplying number of pawn shops, loan companies, and bars in the area. However, a number of owner-operated businesses kept the area alive for commercial activity.

One of the last residents on Sixth Street was local architect David Graeber.  Graeber purchased the building at 410 E. 6th Street and made it his family's residence until he died in 2010.  The building is notable as the last building on Sixth Street to be used exclusively as a primary residence.  The building's interior was modern for the time, including an indoor swimming pool, and substantial sound mitigation.

The Ritz, a historic theater, open its doors on 320 E. 6th Street in 1929. Throughout its history, the Ritz was used as a movie theater, music hall, club, comedy house, and more.  It reopened after renovations in fall 2007 as the new downtown location for the Alamo Drafthouse. On March 20, 2007, the Alamo Drafthouse Cinema announced that they would be relocating their downtown cinema, which was the original theater opened in 1997, to the Ritz. They began construction on April 1, 2007, to revive the Ritz as a movie theater.

Since May 2014, a parking ban is enforced from Thursday evening to Saturday night inside the entertainment district (Interstate 35 to San Jacinto Street) which ends at 2 a.m. past midnight which is defined as a Sunday based on the 24 hour clock) - plans to make the Sixth Street district vehicle free was considered prior to a SXSW '14 drunk driving incident back in March where several pedestrians were struck.

Pecan Street Festival
Until the 1970s, Sixth Street was in decline and downtown was scarcely populated, with abandoned buildings scattered about. A pioneering group of Austinites, including Dr. Emma Lou Linn, known as the Old Pecan Street Association, was instrumental in reclaiming the downtown space and starting renovation of the old buildings. The association needed adequate funding for restoration costs and bringing a street fair to life was a solution to their problems.

In 1978, the Pecan Street Festival was started and included local food and art vendors along with bands from the surrounding area, establishing a community event for cultural preservation and creativity. Due to the festival's positive turnout, the celebration became a biannual spring and fall tradition, honoring 6th Street's original name, Pecan Street. In the past, the event has attracted more than 300,000 people, generating an economic impact around $43 million in 2010.

National Register of Historic Places listings

|}

References

External links

 6th Street In Austin
 City of Austin - Austin's E. 6th Street Map

Streets in Austin, Texas
Culture of Austin, Texas
National Register of Historic Places in Austin, Texas
Historic districts on the National Register of Historic Places in Texas
Entertainment districts in Texas
Tourist attractions in Austin, Texas